Dennis Srbeny (born 5 May 1994) is a German professional footballer who plays as a forward for 2. Bundesliga club SC Paderborn.

Club career

SC Paderborn
Srbeny joined 3. Liga side SC Paderborn 07 in summer 2017 from BFC Dynamo. He spent six months with the club, scoring 9 goals and making 8 assists in 15 league appearances.

Norwich City
On 25 January 2018, Srbeny signed for Championship side Norwich City on a two-and-a-half-year deal for an undisclosed fee. He scored his first league goal for Norwich on 7 April 2018, against Aston Villa in a 3–1 win at Carrow Road.

Return to SC Paderborn
On 8 January 2020, Paderborn announced that Srbeny would return to the club on a two-and-a-half-year deal.

On 9 May 2021, Srbeny scored a brace in Paderborn’s 8–3 away win against Erzgebirge Aue, which was also the highest scoring game in the 2. Bundesliga for the 2020–21 season.
Srbeny made thirty eight appearances and scored twenty goals for SC Paderborn in the 2020–21 season.

Career statistics

Honours
Norwich City
EFL Championship: 2018–19

References

External links
 

1994 births
Living people
Footballers from Berlin
German footballers
Association football forwards
FC Hansa Rostock players
Berliner FC Dynamo players
SC Paderborn 07 players
Regionalliga players
3. Liga players
Norwich City F.C. players
English Football League players
German expatriate sportspeople in England